The 1970 Oklahoma gubernatorial election was held on November 3, 1970, and was a race for Governor of Oklahoma. Democrat David Hall narrowly defeated Republican incumbent Dewey F. Bartlett, a result that was not clear for 21 days as a ballot recount was conducted. American Party candidate Reuel Little, who had helped form the party to back the 1968 presidential campaign of George Wallace, received over 24 thousand votes, dwarfing the difference between Hall and Bartlett.

Results

References

1970
Gubernatorial
Okla